Chigateri is a village in the southern state of Karnataka, famous for sri Naradamuni temple which has followers mainly from Davangere, Bellary, Chitradurga districts of Karnataka State.

See also
 Bellary
 Districts of Karnataka

References

External links
 http://Bellary.nic.in/   

Villages in Bellary district

https://www.google.co.in/search?q=chigateri+narada+muni+temple&oq=chigateri+nara&aqs=chrome.1.69i57j0l2.7763j1j7&client=ms-android-oppo&sourceid=chrome-mobile&ie=UTF-8#fid=0x3bb9ed3470f70c9d:0x3b96db7d0e31dc7d&fpstate=luuv&imagekey=!1e10!2sAF1QipNQXTYdGQv-3UxVMjkpAvZt4M2o1cmYLakpg9V0&viewerState=ga